Mandi is a village in the Dadyal tehsil of Mirpur District of Azad Kashmir, Pakistan.

Demography 

According to the 1998 census of Pakistan, its population was 160. The village has since expanded.

History 

Like many villages in the Mirpur region, many of its residents have emigrated to the United Kingdom. Most of the population belongs to the Gujjar tribe.

References 

Populated places in Mirpur District